Riddick Bowe vs. Evander Holyfield II, billed as Repeat or Revenge, was a professional boxing match that took place on November 6, 1993 for the WBA and IBF heavyweight championships.

Background
The two fighters had previously met a little less than a year before on November 13, 1992. In what was considered one of the greatest heavyweight fights of all time, Bowe defeated Holyfield by unanimous decision to become the Undisputed Heavyweight Champion. Bowe's reign as Undisputed Champion would not last long, as his victory over Holyfield meant he would have to make the first defense of his newly won titles against Lennox Lewis, the man who had defeated him at the 1988 Olympics to capture the Gold Medal. After the two sides could not get a deal done, Bowe chose to forfeit his WBC title rather than face Lewis, throwing the belt in the trash at a press conference. Bowe would then go on to successfully, and easily, defend his remaining WBA and IBF titles twice, first knocking out 34-year-old former WBA Heavyweight champion Michael Dokes in the first round, and then defeating journeyman Jesse Ferguson by way of second round knockout. Holyfield, meanwhile, would have only one fight between his two Bowe fights,  a rematch with Alex Stewart. Though Holyfield looked sluggish throughout the fight, he nevertheless was able to earn the victory via unanimous decision. On August 12, 1993 the much anticipated rematch between Bowe and Holyfield was announced.

The Fight
Like the previous fight, Bowe and Holyfield would again go the distance, this time with Holyfield earning the victory in a close fight via majority decision. Bowe started off strong, winning the first three rounds. Holyfield would storm back to take rounds 4, 5 and 6. In round 7, Holyfield would hit Bowe with a right hook and Bowe would respond by throwing a powerful combination at Holyfield, landing several punches in the process. Shortly after this exchange, the fight was stopped after James Miller crashed into the ring with his powered paraglider causing a 21-minute delay. After the delay, the two fighters would finish the remainder of the round with one judge awarding Holyfield the round, one judge awarding Bowe the round and one judge awarding a draw. Holyfield would dominate round 8, reopening Bowe's wounds with a five-punch combination. Knowing he was behind in the cards, Bowe would become more aggressive in rounds 9, 10 and 11, however in rounds 10 and 11, Holyfield would finish the final 30 seconds of each round by hitting Bowe with several combinations, winning five of the judges six scores for those two rounds. The two men would hammer each other in round 12, attacking one another until the final bell. In the end, Holyfield was announced the winner, becoming only the third man to regain the Heavyweight championship from the man who defeated him for it. It would also be the only loss in Bowe's professional career.

Scorecard

The "Fan Man" Incident
In one of the most bizarre moments in sports history, parachutist James "Fan Man" Miller would crash into the ring during the second minute of round 7 causing a 21-minute delay of the fight. Miller was immediately pulled from the ropes into the crowd by security. He was attacked by both fans and security eventually being knocked unconscious by a member of Bowe's security team. After a short hospital stay, Miller was then taken to the Clark County detention center and charged with dangerous flying, being released after paying $200 bail. The "Fan Man" incident was named Event of the Year by The Ring magazine.

Aftermath
After his victory, Holyfield contemplated retirement, but eventually decided to continue fighting and began looking into a potential unification match with WBC champion Lennox Lewis. However, both the WBA and IBF refused the notion, informing Holyfield they would only sanction a bout with undefeated number one contender Michael Moorer. Holyfield was then offered $20 million by Bowe's manager Rock Newman to accept a third fight with Bowe, but Holyfield turned down the offer and went ahead with his scheduled match against Moorer, due in part to both the WBA and IBF threatening to strip Holyfield of their titles should he have accepted Newman's challenge. Holyfield and Moorer would meet on April 22, 1994 with Moorer scoring the upset victory by majority decision. Meanwhile, after being unable to secure a match for any of the three major heavyweight titles, Bowe would challenge and defeat Herbie Hide for the less-regarded WBO Heavyweight title. After one successful defense against Jorge Luis González, Bowe vacated his title in favor for a third fight with Holyfield. The rubber match was held two years after their second fight on November 4, 1995. Unlike the first two fights, the match would not go the distance, instead Bowe would pick up the victory by 8th round technical knockout.

References

1993 in boxing
Boxing in Las Vegas
1993 in sports in Nevada
Holyfield 2
Bowe 2
International Boxing Federation heavyweight championship matches
World Boxing Association heavyweight championship matches
November 1993 sports events in the United States
Caesars Palace